Jean de Bertier de Sauvigny (1877-1926) was a French politician. He served as a member of the French Senate from 1922 to 1926, representing Moselle.

Early life
Jean de Bertier de Sauvigny was born on October 31, 1877 in Saint-Mihiel, France. He grew up at the Château de La Grange and the Château des Rosaires.

De Bertier de Sauvigny graduated from the École spéciale militaire de Saint-Cyr, followed by the Cavalry School and the École Militaire.

Career
De Bertier de Sauvigny joined the French Army as a second lieutenant in 1899. He served in Morocco from 1909 to 1911. He was a military attache at the Embassy of France, Washington, D.C. from 1911 to 1914, until he returned to France to serve in World War I.

De Bertier de Sauvigny was elected as the mayor of Manom in 1919. He served as a member of the French Senate from 1922 to 1926, representing Moselle.

Personal life and death

De Bertier de Sauvigny married Marie-Louise, Pauline, Huberte Chalneton de Croy in 1908. They resided at the Château de La Grange after World War I. He died on September 26, 1926 in Volmunster, France.

References

1877 births
1926 deaths
People from Meuse (department)
People from Moselle (department)
École Spéciale Militaire de Saint-Cyr alumni
French Army officers
French military personnel of World War I
Mayors of places in Grand Est
French Senators of the Third Republic
Senators of Moselle (department)